Allen Murphy (born July 15, 1952) is a retired American professional basketball player. Born in Birmingham, Alabama, Murphy was a 6 ft 4½ in (1.95 m) 190 lb (86 kg) guard and at played shooting guard for the University of Louisville Cardinals of whom he was part of their 1975 Final Four team. He had a short stint with the NBA's Los Angeles Lakers.

NBA career
Murphy played shortly in the NBA after being drafted by the Phoenix Suns in 1975 in the 2nd round. He never played a game for Phoenix but played a couple of games with the Los Angeles Lakers in the 1976-77 NBA season. Murphy also had a 29-game stint with the American Basketball Association's Kentucky Colonels in 1975–76.

Personal
Murphy attended Parker High School in Birmingham, Alabama.

External links
NBA stats @ basketball-reference.com
NBA stats @ basketballreference.com

1952 births
Living people
African-American basketball players
American men's basketball players
Basketball players from Birmingham, Alabama
Kentucky Colonels players
Los Angeles Lakers players
Louisville Cardinals men's basketball players
Phoenix Suns draft picks
Shooting guards
21st-century African-American people
20th-century African-American sportspeople